N++ is a platform video game developed and published by Metanet Software. It is the third installment of the N franchise, which started with the Adobe Flash game N. It is the sequel to N+. The game was initially released for the PlayStation 4 on July 28, 2015, in North America, and July 29, 2015, in Europe, and was later released for the Microsoft Windows and macOS operating systems on August 25, 2016, and December 26, 2016, respectively. The Xbox One version was released on October 4, 2017. The Linux version of the game was released on May 31, 2018. An expansion to the game, entitled N++ Ultimate Edition, was released for the Windows version of the game on April 21, 2017, as a free update to the game. N++ Ultimate Edition was released for the Nintendo Switch on May 24, 2018.

Gameplay
Gameplay consists of platform-style jumping, dodging, climbing and rebounding from walls, collecting gold pieces to extend the time allotted to complete each level. Players must avoid a myriad of enemies and obstacles along the way.

Release
N++ was announced at Gamescom 2013 during Sony's PlayStation media briefing as the sequel to the game N+. The game was released on PlayStation 4 in North America on July 28, 2015, and July 29 in Europe as a timed exclusive. In February 2016, Metanet developer Raigan Burns stated that they were working to bringing the title to the Steam selling website for personal computers. The Microsoft Windows version was released on August 25, 2016, with the OS X version following on December 26, 2016. A version for Linux was announced, and released on May 31, 2018.

An expansion, entitled N++ Ultimate Edition, was announced on December 5, 2016, and was reported to nearly double the size of the original game with more levels and new colour schemes. The expansion was released for free on April 21, 2017 for the Windows version of the game. It brings the level count to 4340, adds 60 new colour schemes, and adds a new Hardcore game mode, aimed towards veteran players.

Reception
Review aggregator website Metacritic gives N++ an average score of 82/100 for the PS4 version, 88/100 for the Xbox One version and 90/100 for the PC version. GameSpot awarded it a score of 8 out of 10, saying "N++ may represent an 'if it ain’t broke, don’t fix it' sort of expansion, but the exhilaration that it continues to offer speaks to the idea that it may have been perfect to begin with."

PC Gamer's Shaun Prescott gave the PC version of the game a 92/100 rating, describing the game as "a masterful distillation of classic action-platforming gameplay, doling out tension and elation in equal measure."

References

External links
 

2015 video games
Flash games ported to consoles
Indie video games
Video games about ninja
Platform games
PlayStation 4 games
Linux games
MacOS games
Video games developed in Canada
Windows games
Xbox One games
Nintendo Switch games
Multiplayer and single-player video games